Coastwatch Oz is an Australian factual television series screened on the Seven Network That Premiered on 30 January 2014.

About the show 
The show follows the work of officers of Water police from the New South Wales Marine Area Command Police, Fisheries Officers from the New South Wales Department of Primary Industries who are committed to protecting seas and waterways.

The show depicts the police involved in Boat police chases, attending major Water accidents, confronting out-of-control drunk and People on drugs as well as issuing penalty notices to Boat drivers. Each episode follows the progress of a select few incidents involving various Water Police and Fisheries officers, from the first encounter by the officers through to the officers leaving the scene, with the exception that occasionally the officers will escort a driver back to a police station for the purpose of a breath or blood sample.  Fines, court convictions and demerit points issued in relation to each incident are shown in a voiced-over addendum at the end.

As Of 9 January 2015 Greenstone TV Have No Plans to make a 2nd Season.

Greenstone TV Stated On 9 January 2015 That The Series will not be Sold on DVD to The Public.

Episodes 
Season 1

References

2014 Australian television series debuts
Seven Network original programming
Australian non-fiction television series
Television series by Greenstone TV